Luca Antonio Gigli and Luca Antonio Lilius (died 1620) was a Roman Catholic prelate who served as Bishop of Alatri (1597–1620) and Titular Bishop of Paphus (1597).

Biography
On 17 November 1597, Luca Antonio Gigli was appointed during the papacy of Pope Clement VIII as Coadjutor Bishop of Alatri and Titular Bishop of Paphus.
He succeeded to the bishopric on December 1597.
He served as Bishop of Alatri until his death in 1620.

References

External links and additional sources
 (for Chronology of Bishops) 
 (for Chronology of Bishops)  

16th-century Italian Roman Catholic bishops
17th-century Italian Roman Catholic bishops
Bishops appointed by Pope Clement VIII
1620 deaths